John Bradley St. Clair (born July 15, 1977) is a former American football offensive tackle of the National Football League. He was drafted by the St. Louis Rams in the third round of the 2000 NFL Draft. He played college football at Virginia.

St. Clair also played for the Miami Dolphins, Chicago Bears, and Cleveland Browns.

He is a member of Kappa Alpha Psi fraternity.

Early years
St. Clair was an All-America selection by Super Prep following 1995 senior season at William Fleming High School in Roanoke, Virginia. St. Clair earned four letters at tight end and defensive tackle and was also named to the All-regional team by Blue Chip Illustrated and was rated as one of the top-25 players in Virginia. He also advanced to state finals in discus all four years and lettered twice in basketball.

College career
St. Clair was a four-year letterman at the University of Virginia (1996–99) who started at center his final two years. He was named First-team All-America by College Football news and CNN/SI as a senior. He also won the Jacobs Blocking Trophy for the best blocker in the ACC in 1999. As a junior, started 10 games and was named Second-team All-ACC. He moved to the offensive line as a sophomore after playing as a reserve tight end during redshirt freshman season.

Professional career

Pre-draft
St. Clair did 25 reps of 225 pounds on the bench press. He did not do the drills at the 2000 NFL Combine due to a quad injury.  On his Pro Day at Virginia, he did 27 reps of 225 and ran a 5.08 40 yard dash.

St. Louis Rams
St. Clair was drafted by the St. Louis Rams in the 2000 NFL Draft in the third round. He was on the Rams roster in 2000 and 2001 but was inactive for all 32 games plus playoffs.   In 2002 St. Clair started all 16 games for Rams, including 13 at right tackle and three at left tackle. In 2003, he played in all 16 regular season games and St. Louis’ lone playoff game as a reserve tackle and on special teams. He had an 18-yard reception from Marc Bulger at Cleveland (12/8/2003).

Miami Dolphins
On March 12, 2004, the Dolphins agreed to a two-year, $2.6 million contract with St. Clair, who was an unrestricted free agent. St. Clair started all 14 of his games played at right tackle during his lone season with Miami. The Dolphins released St. Clair on September 7, 2005.

Chicago Bears
After he was released by Miami, St. Clair signed with the Bears and played in the final 13 games of the regular season, including a start at each tackle position. The next season, Chicago signed   St.Clair to a three-year $5 million dollar contract and he played all 16 games for third time in his career, with two starts at left tackle for the Bears. He also played in all three postseason contests, including Super Bowl XLI against Indianapolis (2/4/07). In 2007, he saw action in all 16 games with the Bears, starting one contest at left tackle, one at right tackle and three at left guard. He scored the Bears’ first touchdown of the season on a two-yard pass from Rex Grossman vs. Kansas City (9/17). In 2008, he started all 16 games at left tackle for Chicago, marking the second time in his career that he opened all 16 contests and the fifth time in which
he appeared in every regular season contest.

Cleveland Browns
St. Clair signed a three-year $9.1 million contract with the Cleveland Browns on March 17, 2009. He started the first 14 games at right tackle before being inactive for the final two games with an ankle injury.  In 2010, St.Clair sustained a severe ankle injury and only started 11 games.

On February 9, 2011, the Browns released St. Clair.

Personal
St.Clair married Shannon Saint Clair in 2002 in Ridgeway, Va.  The couple has twins, John Jr. and Londen.

References

External links
Chicago Bears bio
Cleveland Browns bio

1977 births
Living people
Sportspeople from Roanoke, Virginia
American football offensive tackles
American football offensive guards
American football centers
Virginia Cavaliers football players
St. Louis Rams players
Miami Dolphins players
Players of American football from Virginia
Chicago Bears players
Cleveland Browns players